Charles Fearon (26 April 1846 – 21 October 1876) was a New Zealand cricketer. He played in one first-class match for Canterbury in 1865/66.

See also
 List of Canterbury representative cricketers

References

External links
 

1846 births
1876 deaths
New Zealand cricketers
Canterbury cricketers
People from Hunstanton